50 meter rifle prone (formerly known as one of four free rifle disciplines) is an International Shooting Sport Federation event consisting of 60 shots from the prone position with a .22 Long Rifle (5.6 mm) caliber rifle. The time limit is 75 minutes for the entire match, including sighting shots, or 90 minutes if there is a need to compensate for slow scoring systems.  In the 2013 ISSF rules the 60-shot prone match consists of 15-minute preparation and sighting time, followed by the match – 60 shots in 50 minutes for electronic scoring, and 60 shots in 60 minutes for paper targets.

Before 2017, the men's event was included in the Olympic program but starting with the 2020 Olympics this event has been removed to promote equal gender in Olympic shooting sports. Mixed gender doubles events were introduced to replace this event and two other individual shooting events. Now this event is contested in World Championships only. This includes a final for the top eight competitors. Beginning with the 2013 season, a new finals format was instituted, in which the qualification score is discarded, and the standings among the top eight shooters are determined by their finals scores alone. The course of fire was also changed significantly with the new rules, from the previous 10-shot and then 20-shots program into a 24-shot elimination format, with the lowest ranking shooter eliminated every two shots, starting from the completion of 12th shot.

The women's event is not Olympic but included in both the ISSF and the CISM World Championships. Since the final was discontinued in 2018, shooters with the same score are separated by a number of tie-breaking criteria, the first being the number of inner tens.

World Championships, Men

World Championships, Men Team

World Championships, Women

World Championships, Women Team

World Championships, total medals

Current world records

Pre 2013 World Records

Current World Records

References

ISSF shooting events
Rifle shooting sports